Paola Núñez Rivas (born April 8, 1978) is a Mexican actress and producer.

Personal life
Núñez was born in Tecate, Baja California, Mexico. She started acting in theater at the age of 12. At the age of 16, she began her full-time career as an actress and graduated from the acting school CEFAC TV Azteca. Núñez also produces soap operas.

She remains close friends with Andrés Palacios, with whom she co-starred Amor en Custodia, a notable telenovela in both their careers. She is fond of extreme sports.

Career 
She began her career at age 12 in plays and sixteen in television. She became notable in Mexican television through the role of "Barbara Bazterrica" in the telenovela Amor en custodia. In 2007 she joined the cause of Greenpeace to raise public awareness about global warming. She has also been featured in several national magazines such as GQ in Mexico.

In July 2010 she appeared in the play Cinco mujeres usando el mismo vestido in Mexico playing Trisha.

The Mexican actress made the villain in the mini series Cien Años de Perdón, a co-production of FIC Latin America and Teleantioquia through TeleColombia same starring actors Ana Claudia Talancón and Manolo Cardona, written by Luis Langlemey (Kdabra, Cumbia Ninja). 2014 Núñez starred in the American telenovela Reina de Corazones along with Eugenio Siller and Laura Flores as the main protagonists while Juan Soler and Catherine Siachoque act as antagonists.

Paola acted as Evelyn Marcus in the Netflix action horror series Resident Evil in 2022.

Filmography

Film roles

Television roles

Awards and nominations

References

External links 

 

Living people
Mexican film actresses
People from Tecate
Mexican telenovela actresses
Mexican female models
Actresses from Baja California
21st-century Mexican actresses
1978 births